Farah Jameela Sheikh (pronounced 'Shake') is the 2013 US Ladies Collegiate Figure Skating National Champion. She is from Lexington, Kentucky.

Career 
She began skating as a preteen. She trained in Bloomfield Hills, Michigan at the Detroit Skating Club under coach Julianne Berlin, a world-level figure skating coach, Yuka Sato, Anjelika Alexeyevna Krylova, Aaron Parchem and Jason Dungjen.  Sheikh was the Figure Skating Michigan State Champion twice during high school.

References

Living people
Year of birth missing (living people)
American female single skaters
Sportspeople from Lexington, Kentucky
21st-century American women